The Rheinmetall Mk 20 Rh-202 (short for Maschinenkanone 20 mm Rheinmetall) is a 20 mm caliber autocannon designed and produced by Rheinmetall. It fires the 20×139mm ammunition originally developed for the Hispano-Suiza HS.820.

The cannon is used on German military vehicles including the Marder infantry fighting vehicle, the Spähpanzer Luchs and some variants of the Wiesel AWC. It is also used in the Argentinian VCTP, an IFV based on the TAM chassis. A towed twin mount antiaircraft version was also produced; it was used by Argentina in the Falklands War.

German naval ships also employed Rh 202 mounts (usually two on frigates and destroyers, four on larger replenishment ships), but they have been or are currently being replaced with the new Mauser (now a subsidiary of Rheinmetall) MLG 27 remote-controlled guns of 27 mm calibre.

A version modified to fire the U.S. M50 series of 20×102mm ammunition loaded into the M14 link belt has been offered to no avail for the U.S. Government by Maremont Corporation, of Saco, Maine, licensed by Rheinmetall under marketing arrangement.

20 mm twin anti-aircraft mount variant 

Rheinmetall Zwillingsflak twin-gun anti-aircraft system began development in 1968 to meet the requirements of the low-level air defence units of the German Air Force, i.e. "to engage low and very low approaching enemy aircraft with all appropriate means in time to prevent them from firing their weapons or delivering their ordnance, or at least to prevent them from carrying out an accurate attack on an air force installation."

The Budget Committee of the Bundestag approved the Zwillingsflak system in December 1969, and serial production began in 1972; the first production systems reached units of the Bundeswehr on October 12 of that year. Rheinmetall delivered the last of these in 1976.

This gun was also used by the Argentine Air Force, including during the Falklands War.

Since 1981, it was used by the Portuguese Army and Portuguese Air Force.

Operators
 – A total of 15 Rh 202 used by the Argentine Air Force were captured in the Falklands Conflict by the British. 9 at Port Stanley Airport and 6 at Goose Green airfield
 – 1015 ordered in 1969. Used between 1972 and 1992, twin model now withdrawn from service, but the single barrel version still is used, usually vehicle-mounted
 – Some 326 used by the Hellenic Air Force
 – Some 30 used by the Army

 - Deployed on Fiat CM6614.

 - Deployed on Thyssen Henschel UR-416 of the Saudi Special Security Force.
 - Deployed on the naval ships SLNS Sayurala (2016), SLNS Sindurala (2018) and on other vessels.
 - Secondary armament on naval patrol vessels. 
 – Deployed on Marder 1A3 IFVs.

Specifications
 Type: single-barrel automatic cannon
 Caliber: 20 × 139 mm (0.79 in)
 Operation: Gas-unlocked sliding breech block, blowback, recoiling base
 Length: 2612 mm (8 ft 7 in)
 Barrel length: 2002 mm
 Rifling angle: 6°
 Weight (complete): 75 kg (165 lb) single feed; 83 kg (183 lb) dual feed
 Rate of fire: 880–1,000 rpm
 Effective range: 2000 m
 Max. range: 7000 m
 Muzzle velocity: 1,050 to 1,150 m/s (3,440 to 3,770 ft/s)
 Recoil force: 550–750 kg
 Projectile weight: 134 g (0.3 lb) full calibre; 108 g APDS

Gallery

See also
 ZU-23-2
 Hispano-Suiza HS.820
 Oerlikon 35 mm twin cannon
 List of artillery
 List of anti-aircraft guns
 List of artillery of Germany

References

External links
 MK20 Rh 202 specifications in "Jane's Armour and Artillery Upgrades, May'08 (extract)"

20 mm artillery
Autocannon
Vehicle weapons
Naval guns of Germany
Cold War weapons of Germany
MK 20 Rh 202
Military equipment introduced in the 1960s